Bogdan Dzakovic is a 14-year veteran of the Security Division of the Federal Aviation Administration in the United States. He started off his FAA career as a field agent and Federal Air Marshal, then served as a Team Leader in the Air Marshal program. Since 1995, he had served as a Team Leader of the FAA's Red Team, which conducted undercover tests on airport security through simulated terrorist attacks.  He testified before the National Commission on Terrorist Attacks Upon the United States, discussing his experience as well as FAA failures that contributed to the September 11th attacks.
Published book in 2016:  Fortress of Deceit: the Story of a 9/11 Whistleblower ,  which examines the root cause of the government failures leading up to the attacks,  as well as its nefarious aftermath which we are living through today.

References

External links
 Newspaper article on his work

Year of birth missing (living people)
Living people
Sky marshals
American civil servants
American people of Serbian descent